Seed Certification Agency is an autonomous government agency responsible for the certification of agricultural seeds in Bangladesh and is located in Gazipur, Bangladesh. It is also responsible for quality control of seeds in the market. It is under the Ministry of Agriculture.

History
Seed Certification Agency was established on 22 January 1974 by the government of Bangladesh as part of the First National Five Year Plan (1973–78). it has 7 regional offices for 7 divisions of Bangladesh and 64 offices in all 64 districts of Bangladesh. It initially only certified seeds produced by Bangladesh Agricultural Development Corporation but now also certifies seeds of private firms.

References

Government agencies of Bangladesh
1974 establishments in Bangladesh
Organisations based in Gazipur
Regulators of Bangladesh